The men's 50m freestyle events at the 2020 World Para Swimming European Championships were held at the Penteada Olympic Pools Complex.

Medalists

Results

S3
Final

S4
Heat 1

Final

S5
Heats

Final

S6
Heats

Final

S7
Heats

Final

S8
Heats

Final

S9
Heats

Final

S10
Heats

Final

S11
Heats

Final

S12
Heats

Final

S13
Heats

Final

References

2020 World Para Swimming European Championships